Ercole Lelli (14 September 1702 – 7 March 1766) was an Italian painter of the late-Baroque, active mainly in Northern Italy, including his native city of Bologna, as well as Padua and Piacenza.

Lelli was a pupil of the painter Giovanni Pietro Zanotti, but he also gravitated towards sculptural work. He excelled in the study of the anatomy of the human body as well as painting.
Starting in 1742 he helped prepare artistic anatomical wax displays at the University of Bologna. 
The wax modeler and anatomist Giovanni Manzolini worked as his assistant from 1743.
Manzolini resigned in late 1746 after three years.  
He felt bitterly that Lelli had deprived him of recognition for his greater knowledge of anatomy and anatomical sculpture.
Nicolo Toselli was another of Lelli's pupils.

In 1746 Lelli became a member of both the Bolognese art society, Accademia Clementina, and the science society, Istituto delle scienze. He had completed many medals for the local Mint.  A few pictures are extant, including a Virgin and child with St. Anthony of Padua and St. Clara for the church of Sant' Andrea delle Scuole at Bologna; and a St. Fidèle for the church of the Cappuccini at Piacenza. He was an eminent teacher of design, and in 1759 became director of the Academy at Bologna, the city where he died. He has also left some engravings, such as Hagar and Ishmael. A posthumous book with a few engravings, titled Anatomia esterna del corpo umano (External Anatomy of the Human Body) was published in Bologna.

Notable students
Giles Hussey

References

 S. Falabella, «LELLI (Lellj), Ercole». In: Dizionario Biografico degli Italiani, Roma: Istituto dell'Enciclopedia Italiana, Vol. LXIX, 2005 (on-line)

External links
A Brief History of the collection at the Museo delle cere anatomiche in Bologna

1702 births
1766 deaths
18th-century Italian painters
Italian male painters
Painters from Bologna
Italian Baroque painters
Italian sculptors
Italian male sculptors
Italian anatomists
18th-century Italian male artists